Acharistsqali ( - literal meaning: Adjara's water) is a river of southwestern Georgia. It is a right tributary of the river Çoruh (Chorokhi), which flows into the Black Sea.

References

Rivers of Georgia (country)